The Column of the Goths is a Roman victory column dating to the third or fourth century A.D.  It stands in what is now Gülhane Park, Istanbul, Turkey.

History 
The name of the 18.5 metre high free-standing Proconnesian marble pillar which is surmounted with a Corinthian capital derives from a Latin inscription at its base, commemorating a Roman victory over the invading Goths: FORTUNAE REDUCI OB DEVICTUS GOTHOS ("To Fortuna, who returns by reason of victory over the Goths"), which has been shown to have replaced an earlier Latin inscription. The dating and original dedication of the column are uncertain.

Most likely, the column was erected to honor the victories of either Claudius II Gothicus (r. 268-270) or Constantine the Great (r. 306-337), both of whom are noted for achieving victories over the Goths. According to Byzantine historian Nicephorus Gregoras (c. 1295-1360), the column was once surmounted by a statue to Byzas the Megarian, the semi-legendary founder of Byzantium. Other sources mention a statue of the goddess Tyche, now lost.

At any rate, it represents the oldest monument of the Roman era still extant in the city, possibly going back to the city's history as Byzantium and preceding its refoundation as Constantinople.

References

Sources

External links 

Goths
Goths
Corinthian columns
Latin inscriptions
3rd-century inscriptions
4th-century inscriptions
Fatih